Posner or Pozner may refer to:
Posner (surname)
Posner Park, in Florida, US
Posner's theorem in algebra
Posner cueing task, a neuropsychological test

See also
Posener, a surname